Switzerland sent a delegation of 26 athletes (17 male, 9 female) to compete at the 2008 Summer Paralympics in Beijing. The stated goal was to win a minimum of 11 medals and finish the games among the top 50 nations. Swiss athletes competed in 6 sports at the Beijing games and performed as follows:

Medallists

Archery

3 competitors:

Men

Women

Athletics

14 competitors:

Men

12-time Paralympic gold medallist Heinz Frei also competed in cycling.
Sprinter Simon Vögeli was excluded after a pre-games classification concluded that his disability did not fit Paralympic criteria. A protest by the Swiss delegation was rejected. As a consequence of that decision, Switzerland also had to withdraw their respective 4 × 100 m relay team for lack of participants.

Pentathlon

Women

Cycling

5 competitors:

Men
Time trials & Road races

Pursuits

Women
Time trials & Road races

Shooting

1 competitor:

Men

Swimming

1 competitor:

Women

Wheelchair Tennis

3 competitors:

Men

Women

See also
2008 Summer Paralympics
Switzerland at the Paralympics
Switzerland at the 2008 Summer Olympics

References

External links
Beijing 2008 Paralympic Games Official Site
International Paralympic Committee

Nations at the 2008 Summer Paralympics
2008
Paralympics